Ha Ki-Rak (Korean: 하기락; 1912–1997) was a professor and major figure in Korean anarchism.

Biography
The political life of Ha Ki-Rak, a Korean anarcho-pacifist academic, writer, and philosopher, began in 1929, when he participated in student demonstrations in Kwangju, pre-dating the mass student demonstrations in 1980 by 51 years. 

While a student at Waseda University in Japan, during the Japanese occupation of Korea, Ha Ki-Rak was an anti-imperialist activist and joined the Tokyo Dong-hung No-dong Dong-meng (Workers' League of Tokyo). 

After the liberation from Japan in 1945, he helped form the first Korean anarchist organization, Ja-yoo sa-hoi kun-sul-ja yun-meng (League of Free Social Constructors), authoring its founding declaration and political program. 

In 1946, when Korean anarchists returning from exile held a meeting at Kum-gang-sa in Kyung-sang Province, Ha Ki-Rak edited their journal, Ja-yu yun-hap (Libertarian Federation), and afterwards participated in the unified organization they decided to create in order to rebuild the country, the Dok-lip no-nong-dang (Independent Workers and Farmers Party). 

In 1972, he founded the Han-kuk ja-ju-in yun-meng (Korean Anarchist Federation) in Seoul. In 1978, he published A History of the Korean Anarchist Movement. In 1987, he took part in the congress of the Korean Anarchist Federation, which was established by Korean anarchists Lee Jung-Kyu and Lee Eul-Kyu. In 1995, two years before his death, he was a leading organizer of the World Peace Conference in Seoul.

External links
The Korean anarchist movement

References

Korean anarchists
Anarcho-pacifists